Madonna is the second Korean extended play (EP) by South Korean girl group Secret. It was released on August 12, 2010 through TS Entertainment, and contains five tracks. The EP debuted at No. 5 on the Gaon Album Chart, while the album's lead single "Madonna" debuted at No. 1 on the Gaon Singles Chart and sold over 1,839,869 digital copies in South Korea throughout 2010. Kang Jiwon and Kim Kibum, the composers who wrote "Madonna" highlighted that the inspiration behind the song is about living with confidence by becoming an icon in this generation, like the American singer Madonna.

Promotion 
"Madonna" was first used as a promotional track from the album. On August 5, 2010, a teaser video was released online. In the teaser, the girls were performing the album track "Empty Space". The final music video premiered on August 12, 2010 along with Madonnas release. Secret had their debut performances of "Madonna" on Mnet's M! Countdown, KBS's Music Bank, MBC's Show! Music Core and SBS's Inkigayo from August 12 to August 15.

Track listing

Charts

Album chart

Sales

Release history

Credits and personnel 
These credits were adapted from the Madonna (EP) liner notes.

Kim Tae-sung – executive producer co-producing
Song Jieun - vocals
Han Sunhwa - vocals
Jun Hyoseong - vocals
Jung Hana - vocals, rap
Kang Jiwon - co-producing, songwriting, arranger, music
Kim Kibum - co-producing, songwriting,  music

References

External links
 
 

2010 EPs
Secret (South Korean band) EPs
Korean-language EPs
Kakao M EPs
TS Entertainment EPs
Cultural depictions of Madonna